Carlo Penco (born August 1948) is an Italian analytic philosopher and  full professor in  philosophy of language at the University of Genoa in Italy.

Biography
Penco received his Ph.D. in Philosophy Summa cum Laude at the University of Genoa in 1972 with a specialization in the philosophy of science (at the time in Italy there were no PhD; he became a member of the PhD program later as a teacher). He studied with Evandro Agazzi in Genoa, with Michael Dummett in Oxford, and later with Robert Brandom at the University of Pittsburgh.
He has received various academic awards and fellowships including: CNR Fellow (1976), NATO Fellow at Oxford University (1979) and Fellow of the Center for Philosophy of Science in Pittsburgh, Pennsylvania (1998). He has been President of the   Italian Society for the Analytic Philosophy (2002-2004), and member of Steering Committee of the Italian Society for Logic and the Philosophy of Sciences and the European Society for Analytic Philosophy. Together with Joao Branquino and Josep Corbi, he began a series of "Latin Meeting in Analytic Philosophy", in order to foster the exchange of ideas among Analytic Philosophers in the southern countries in Europe, with connection with Latin America.  
He has been teaching in South of Italy (University of Lecce) between 1988 and 1991; then he went to the University of Genoa, where he is still teaching as full professor in Philosophy of Language. President of the Master in Philosophy during the period 2004-2010, he became Head of the Doctoral School in Human Science. 
He has been working in the Editorial or Scientific Committees for various journals, such as Epistemologia, An International Journal for Logic and Philosophy of Science,  Networks, A journal for the philosophy of Artificial Intelligence and the Cognitive Sciences,  European Journal of Analytic Philosophy, Theoria (A Swedish Journal for Philosophy). 
His early research interests has been mainly on the philosophy of the later Wittgenstein and the philosophy of Frege. He began to work on the problem of context for the Meetings "Modeling and Using Contexts" since 1999. His recent interests are more strictly linked to different topics in the Philosophy of Language and Pragmatics, mainly on the problem of the boundaries between semantics and pragmatics.

Published works
Books (author)
 "Frege", Carocci, Roma, 2010
 Introduzione alla filosofia del linguaggio Laterza, Roma-Bari 2004 (3 ed. 2005)
 Vie della Scrittura, Milano, Angeli, 1994 (2 ed. 2002)
 Matematica e gioco linguistico, Wittgenstein e la filosofia della matematica del '900. Firenze, Le Monnier, 1981

Books (editor)
 "Explaining the Mental" (With M. Beaney and M. Vignolo), Cambridge Scholar Publishing, 2007.
 La svolta contestuale (a reading of original papers in philosophy of language and artificial intelligence by V. Akman, M. Benerecetti, M. Benzi, P. Bouquet, M. Frixione, C. Ghidini, F. Giunchiglia, F. Guala, M. Motterlni, J. Perry, E. Picardi, S. Predelli, M. Sbisà, A. Varzi, N. Vassallo) McGraw Hill, 2002
 (with Eva Picardi): Gottlob Frege, Senso, funzione e concetto (philosophical papers 1891-1897) Laterza, Bari, 2001.
 Filosofia analitica - Reading of Frege, Russell, Wittgenstein, Quine, Austin, Grice, Searle, Putnam - La Nuova Italia, Firenze, 2001.
 (with G. Sarbia) Alle radici della filosofia analitica (Acts of the first Italian conference of the Italiana Society of Analytic Philosophy - with edition in print and in hypertext), Erga, Genova, 1996
 (with C. Dalla Pozza) Linguaggi e Macchine - Epistemologia (special issues on logic and artificial intelligence) - 1993
 (with A. Bottani) Significato e teorie del linguaggio (Reading including Brandom, Davidson, Dummett, Kaplan, Kripke, Putnam, Barwise, Hall Partee...) Milano, Angeli, 1991.
 Italian edition of E. Tugendhat Vorlesungen über die Sprachanalytische Philosophie:Introduzione alla filosofia analitica, Marietti, Genova, 1989
 (with D. Marconi and M. Andronico), Capire Wittgenstein Readings (including Von Wright, Dummett, Stroud, Black, Kenny, Robinson, ....) Genova, Marietti, 1988
 Italian edition (with M. Sbisà) of J.L.Austin How to do things with words: Come fare cose con le parole, Genova, Marietti. 1987
 Italian edition of M. Dummett, Philosophy of language, (with translation): Filosofia del linguaggio. Saggio su Frege, Genova, Marietti, 1983

Selected papers
 "Essentially Incomplete Descriptions", European Journal for Analytic Philosophy, 2011 
 "Assertion and Inference" in Towards an Analytic Pragmatism, CEUR Workshop, 2009: http://ceur-ws.org/Vol-444
 "The influence of Einstein on Wittgenstein's Philosophy", in  Philosophical Investigations 2010
 "Il senso degli enunciati. La nefasta influenza del Tractatus sulla filosofia della logica", in L. Perissinotto (a cura di) /Un filosofo senza trampoli. Saggi su Ludwig Wittgenstein, Mimesis, 2010.
 "Rational procedures: A Neo-Fregean Perspective on Thought and Judgement" in Yearbook of Philosophical Hermeneutics: The dialogue, Münster, 2009 (137-153)
 "Keeping track of individuals: Brandom's Analysis of Kripke's puzzle and the content of belief". In: S. Pirmin, Stekeler, Weithofer (eds) The Pragmatics of Making It Explicit, Benjamins, Amsterdam ( 163-185).
 "Wittgenstein, olismo ed esperimenti mentali:l'influenza di Einstein" in Paradigmi, 2, 2008
 "Inferenza e contesto: quali limiti alla libertà di parola?",  in Cassazione penale, XLVIII, 2008 (3060-3075).
 "Idiolect and Context"; in R.E.Auxier and L.E. Hahn (eds.) The Philosophy of Michael Dummett - Library of Living Philosophers, vol. XXXI, 2007(567-590). 
 "Competenza pragmatica come filtro", in M.Andronico, A. Paternoster, A. Voltolini, Il significato eluso. Saggi in onore di Diego Marconi, Rivista di Estetica, n. 34 (1/2007), anno XLVII
 "Context and Contract" in Perspectives on Contexts, edited by Paolo Bouquet, Luciano Serafini, and Rich Thomason. CSLI, Stanford, 2006.
 Enciclopedia Filosofica di Gallarate,  2006, Voci: E. Anscombe, Apriori-Aposteriori, D. Armstrong, R. Brandom, Deflazionismo, M. Dummett, Estensionalita', G. Evans, Filosofia Postanalitica, G. Frege, P. Geach, Gioco Linguistico, Intensione/Estensione, F. Kambartel, D. Kaplan, S. Kripke, L. Linsky, J. Mcdowell, Opacita' Referenziale, J. Perry, A. Prior, E. Tugendhat, C. Wright.
 "Converging towards What? on semantic and pragmatic competence" in P. Bouquet, L. Serafini, Context representation and reasoning 2005, proceedings of the first international workshop, CEUR-WS, vol.136, 2005 <http://sunsite.informatik.rwth-aachen.de/Publications/CEUR-WS/Vol-136/>
 "Keeping Track of Individuals: Brandom's Analysis of Kripke's Puzzle and the Content of Belief", in Pragmatics and Cognition, 13:1 (2005), 177-201
 "Anatra all'arancia: il tema del contesto nella filosofia analitica", Teoria 2005 (1) pp. 3–21.
 "Wittgenstein, Locality and Rules" in E.Picardi, A.Coliva, Wittgenstein Today, Il Poligrafo, Padova, 2004, pp. 249–274.
 "Frege, sense and limited rationality" Modern Logic Vol.9, 2001-2003 (Issue 29) pp. 53–65
 "Frege: Two thesis, two senses", in History and Philosophy of Logic 2003, vol. 24, n.2 (pp. 87–109).
 "Filosofia del linguaggio", in Floridi, Luciano (a cura di), Linee di Ricerca, SWIF, 2003 (pp. 1–26).
 (con M. Frixione) "Sensi fregeani, procedure e limiti computazionali", in Vassallo N. La filosofia di Gottlob Frege, Angeli, Milano 2003 (pp. 163–180).
 "Introduzione" a J. Perry, Contesti De Ferrari, Genova, 2002.
 "Holism, Strawberries and Hairdryers" in Topoi 2002 (pp. 47–54)
 "Local Holism" in V. Akman, P. Bouquet, R. Thomason, R.A. Young (eds.) Modeling and Using Context - Proceedings of the Third International and Interdisciplinary Conference on Modeling and Using Context (CONTEXT'01), [Lecture Notes in AI Volume 2116] Springer Verlag, July 2001 (pp. 290–303)
 " Three alternatives on contexts" in D. Marconi (editor) Knowledge and Meaning. Topics in Analytic Philosophy edizioni Mercurio, Vercelli, 2000 (pp. 113–130).
 " Ragione e Pratica Sociale " in Rivista di Filosofia 3, 1999 (467-486)
 " Objective and Cognitive Context " in Paolo Bouquet, Patrick Brézillon, Luciano Serafini, Francesca Castellani eds. Modeling and Using Context, 2nd International and Interdisciplinary Conference, CONTEXT'99 Springer, 1999 (270-283).
 " Sensi, catene anaforiche e olismo " in Iride 1999 (190-195)
 " Context and Incomplete knowledge" in Third European Congress of Analytical Philosophy, Maribor 1999 (book of abstracts, p. 187)
 "Holism in Artificial Intelligence?" in Language, Quantum, Music edited by M.L.Dalla Chiara, Laudisa and Giuntini, Kluwer, 1999 (pp. 37–48) (see: expanded version)
 "Wittgenstein and our times" R.Egidi (ed.), In Search of a New Humanism: the Philosophy of Georg Henrik von Wright, Kluwer, Dordrecht,1999 (47-53).
 "Competenza e competenze: tre tesi su competenza, linguaggio e significato" in Iride 1998 (392-397).
 "Frege e Carnap: verso una teoria integrata del senso" in Vito Michele Abrusci, Carlo Cellucci, Roberto Cordeschi, Vincenzo Fano (a cura di) Prospettive della Logica e della Filosofia della scienza: Atti del Convegno SILFS, ETS, Pisa, 1998 (pp. 345–360)
 "Dummett and Wittgenstein's philosophy of Mathematics", in McGuinness B. - Oliveri G. The Philosophy of Michael Dummett, Kluwer Academic Press, (pp. 113–136), 1994.
 "Wittgenstein et le Conventionalisme" in G.Sommaruga (a cura di) Aspects et problémes du Conventionalisme, Fribourg, Presse Universitaire di Fribourg, 1992
 "Frames and Logic in Knowledge Representation" (con D.Palladino), Epistemologia, 15 (119-140), 1992.
 Italian edition of G.Frege's letters to Wittgenstein: G. Frege, "Lettere a Wittgenstein", in Epistemologia, 14 (189-204), 1991
 "Eredi del terzo regno" in Epistemologia 12 (253-276) [fascicolo speciale Logica e Ontologia], 1989
 "Mathematik und Interesse" in R.Haller (a cura di) Sprache und Erkenntnis als Soziale Tatsache, Wien, Holder-Pichler-Tempsky (49-56), 1981
 "Intuition in mathematics: Wittgenstein's Remarks" in Epistemologia 4 (77-94), 1981
 "Matematica e Regole. Wittgenstein interprete di Kant" in Epistemologia 2 (123-154), 1979
 "Intension: Wittgenstein's Philosophy of Mathematics considered under the influence of Frege's Tradition" in: Akten des 2.Int. Wittgenstein Simposiums: Wittgenstein und sein Einfluss auf die gegenwartige Philosophie, Wien, Holder-Pichler-Tempsky (191-195), 1978

External links
A collection of on-line papers (English and Italian) by Carlo Penco can be found here
Complete list of publications
Home Page, University of Genoa

1948 births
Living people
University of Genoa alumni
Alumni of the University of Oxford
University of Pittsburgh alumni
20th-century Italian philosophers
21st-century Italian philosophers
Philosophers of language
Philosophy academics
Academic staff of the University of Genoa
Academic staff of the University of Salento